The Erickson Bluffs are a series of conspicuous rock bluffs extending from Gilbert Bluff to Mount Sinha, forming the southwest edge of the McDonald Heights, near the coast of Marie Byrd Land, Antarctica. A portion of the bluffs were photographed from aircraft of the United States Antarctic Service, 1939–41. They were mapped by the United States Geological Survey from surveys and U.S. Navy air photos, 1959–65, and were named by the Advisory Committee on Antarctic Names for Albert W. Erickson, leader of a biology party that made population studies of seals, whales, and birds in the pack ice of the Bellingshausen Sea and Amundsen Sea using USCGC Southwind and its two helicopters, 1971–72.

See also
Mount Petrides

References 

Cliffs of Marie Byrd Land